Rock and Roll Animals is a concept album by British alternative rock artist Luke Haines. The album follows its predecessor in the way the concept is introduced, but it is in no case a sequel.

Track 9 is written by Haines ex-collaborator from Black Box Recorder, John Moore well known for his contribution to The Jesus and Mary Chain.

The title might refer to the Lou Reed 1974 live album Rock 'n' Roll Animal.

Concept
The concept follows a narrative story about outsiders people represented as animals. As in its predecessor, the album uses some namedropping to name the characters and reflect their personalities. The visual representation on the cover art is also a reference as the anthropomorphic characters have similar traits from the named artists. The main characters are a cat called Gene Vincent, a badger called Nick Lowe and a fox called Jimmy Pursey.

A few other bands and artists are named in the song Rock N Roll Animals In Space such as Deep Purple, Led Zeppelin, The Rolling Stones, Brian Jones, The Soft Machine and Robert Wyatt. There are also controversial denunciations involving some of the artists such as Led Zeppelin stole the blues, Not righteous and The Stones with Brian Jones were righteous even though he was probably evil.

Reception

Jake Kennedy of Record Collector said if the album's concept "sounds a lot to take in, it isn't really, but it doesn't make any more sense than that". He added that this "loosely child-friendly album might well be a definite way" to enter into Haines' catalogue.

Track listing
All tracks written and composed by Luke Haines except for track 9 by John Moore.
 "Magic Town" – 2:31
 "Magic Interlude 1" – 0:38
 "Rock N Roll Animals" – 2:59
 "A Badger Called Nick Lowe" – 2:51
 "Three Friends" – 3:46
 "Gene Vincent (The Rock'n'roll Mums and The Rock'n'roll Dads)" – 3:41
 "Magic Interlude 2" – 1:32
 "The Birds... The Birds" – 2:44
 "The Angels Of The North" – 3:39
 "...We Do" – 2:31
 "From Hersham To Heaven" – 2:18
 "Rock N Roll Animals In Space" – 3:20

Credits
Music
 Luke Haines – guitar, piano, hammond, ocarina, autoharp, jaw harp, sitar, drums, vocals, songwriting
 Julia Davis - narration
 Sian Superman – alto recorder
 John Moore - songwriting (track 9)

Production
 Luke Haines – producer
 George Shilling – mastering

Visual
 Sian Superman – illustration
 Luke Haines – painting
 Louise Mason - Sleeve, Layout

References

2013 albums
Luke Haines albums
Cherry Red Records albums